The Unutterable is the 21st album by English rock band the Fall, released in 2000. It was recorded with much the same lineup as had appeared on the group's previous album, 1999's The Marshall Suite (although Kazuko Hohki—the singer from the English-based Japanese band Frank Chickens—provides extra vocals on one track). However, whilst this version of the band was still coming together as the previous album was being made, by the time of the current record, they had had a year to jell as a unit. Therefore, while there is some similarity in the sound of the two, The Unutterable was much more consistent in its production and songwriting. It was generally well received by the critics, being praised as a "career peak" by Dave Simpson of The Guardian and prompting Piers Martin of the NME to suggest, "...this is as vital and relevant as The Fall have sounded for a considerable length of time.<ref name=nme>Martin, Piers (Nov. 2000). [http://www.visi.com/fall/news/001201.html#nme "The Unutterable"] . NME.</ref> "

Lyrically, the album covers a number of diverse themes. On "Dr Bucks' Letter", lead singer Mark E. Smith appears to dispraise superficial materialist modernity, stating, "I was in the realm of the essence of Tong", an oblique reference to British DJ Pete Tong. In the song, Smith lists the five things without which he, or that Tong, cannot leave home: sunglasses, music, PalmPilot, mobile phone and American Express card. Elsewhere on the album, Smith's lyrics discuss issues such as drugs on the ranting "Ketamine Sun", and his favourite meal on the jazz-influenced "Pumpkin Soup and Mashed Potatoes".The Unutterable is notable for not featuring a cover song in any format, unlike all of the group's other studio albums from Bend Sinister forward; although "Ketamine Sun" reportedly started life as a cover of Lou Reed's "Kill Your Sons", there is little musical similarity between the two tracks.

This was the first and only Fall 'official' studio release to be issued on CD only, without a corresponding vinyl version. A double-LP set was eventually issued through Let Them Eat Vinyl in 2014 with the same track listing.

Track listing

 2008 Special Deluxe Edition 
Disc 1 - The Unutterableas per original CD''

Disc 2 - Testa Rossa monitor mixes

Notes
The Testa Rossa monitor mixes are early, rough versions of most of the album tracks, as well as two instrumentals not used on the final album. On the reissue, the position of the apostrophe has changed in "Dr. Bucks' Letter"  to "Dr. Buck's Letter".

Personnel
The Fall
Mark E. Smith – vocals, sound effects
Julia Nagle – keyboards, guitar, backing vocals, programming
Neville Wilding – guitar, backing vocals; lead vocals on "Hands Up Billy"
Adam Helal – bass guitar, Pro Tools, backing vocals 
Tom Head – drums, percussion, backing vocals 
Additional personnel
Kazuko Hohki – vocals on "Cyber Insekt"
Steve Evets - vocals on "Midwatch 1953"
Ben Pritchard - guitar on "Dr. Bucks' Letter" and "Midwatch 1953"
Grant Showbiz - backing vocals; arrangement on "Pumpkin Soup and Mashed Potatoes"
Rob Ayling - executive producer, voice on "Octo Realm" (uncredited)
Technical
Grant Showbiz - production
Mark E. Smith – production
Adam Helal – engineering, programming (Sonic Surgery)
Andy Drelincourt – engineering, programming (Testa Rossa)
Mike Body – engineering, programming (Streetlevel 2)
Pascal Le Gras - cover art

References 

The Fall (band) albums
2000 albums
Albums produced by Grant Showbiz